The 1961 Eastern Michigan Hurons football team represented Eastern Michigan University in the Interstate Intercollegiate Athletic Conference (IIAC) during the 1961 NCAA College Division football season. In their 10th season under head coach Fred Trosko, the Hurons compiled a 0–8–1 record (0–6 against IIAC opponents) and were outscored by their opponents, 171 to 49. The team played Ball State to a scoreless tie. Norm Jacobs and Don Drinkham were the team captains. Jacobs received the team's most valuable player award. The team's statistical leaders included George Beaudette with 696 passing yards and 703 yards of total offense, Don Oboza with 207 rushing yards, and Pat Dignan with 195 passing yards.  The 1961 season was part of a 29-game winless streak that spanned from 1959 to 1962.

Schedule

References

Eastern Michigan
Eastern Michigan Eagles football seasons
College football winless seasons
Eastern Michigan Hurons football